Franz Etzel (12 August 1902 – 9 May 1970) was a German politician of the CDU. 

Etzel was born in Wesel, Rhine Province.  From 1949 to 4 January 1953 and from 1957 to 1965 Etzel was member of the German Bundestag. From 1957 to 1961 he was Minister of Finance. He died in Wittlaer by Düsseldorf, aged 67.

See also
List of German finance ministers

References
Franz Etzel (1902-1970), Bundesminister

1902 births
1970 deaths
People from Wesel
People from the Rhine Province
German National People's Party politicians
Finance ministers of Germany
Members of the Bundestag for North Rhine-Westphalia
Members of the Bundestag 1961–1965
Members of the Bundestag 1957–1961
Members of the Bundestag 1949–1953
Members of the Bundestag for the Christian Democratic Union of Germany